Hovhannes M'rkuz Jułayeci (also spelled Jughayetsi; , ; 1643–1715) was an Armenian theologian and philosopher based in New Julfa in Safavid Iran. He is known to have written various theological and philosophical works in Armenian, Persian and maybe Arabic.

Biography 
Hovhannes was born in 1643 in New Julfa, located on the outskirts of Isfahan, the Safavid capital of Iran. During the start of the 17th-century, hundreds of Armenian families were forced to relocate to New Julfa by Shah Abbas. In 1669, Hovhannes was elevated to the position of vardapet ("doctor of theology") by the Armenian Apostolic Church. He thus also became known as "Hovhannes vardapet", a name translitrated in Persian sources as "Avanus khalifa", "Vanis khalifa’ or "Khalifa Avanus". Hovhannes debated both Shia Muslim scholars and European missionaries on a number of occasions. One of his pupils was the Iranian scholar Hazin Lahiji, whom he taught about the New Testament and some aspects of Christian theology. According to Hazin, Hovhannes was well-read in Islamic philosophy and spoke Arabic and Persian fluently. 

Hovhannes was one of the monks that Shah Soltan Hoseyn spoke with about religion and theology during the latters visit to the Vank Cathedral in New Julfa. Hovhannes is known to have written various theological and philosophical works in Armenian, Persian and maybe Arabic. However, most studies have been directed towards his Armenian works. His book Kitab-i Avanus khalifa-yi masihi ("The book of the Christian Hovhannes khalifa") is among those that still exist in bilingual manuscripts, with Armenian on the right folios and Persian or Arabic on the left folios, but others, like his Usul-i din-i isavī u furu-i an ("The principles of the Christian faith and its practical aspects"), seem to have only been published in Persian. 

Hovhannes died in 1715 in New Julfa.

References

Sources 
 
 
 
 

1643 births
1715 deaths
People from Isfahan
Persian Armenians
17th-century people of Safavid Iran
18th-century people of Safavid Iran
17th-century Armenian writers
18th-century Armenian writers
17th-century Persian-language writers
18th-century Persian-language writers
Safavid theologians